Zalesie  is a village in the administrative district of Gmina Czarna, within Łańcut County, Subcarpathian Voivodeship, in south-eastern Poland.

The village has a population of 850.

References

Villages in Łańcut County